The Old English Bible translations are the partial translations of the Bible prepared in medieval England into the Old English language. The translations are from Latin texts, not the original languages.

Many of these translations were in fact Bible glosses, prepared to assist clerics whose grasp of Latin was imperfect and circulated in connection with the Vulgate Latin Bible that was standard in Western Christianity at the time.  Old English was one of very few early medieval vernacular languages the Bible was translated into, and featured a number of incomplete Bible translations, some of which were meant to be circulated, like the Paris Psalter or Ælfric's Hexateuch.

Early history (600-874) 
Information about translations is limited before the Synod of Whitby in 664. Aldhelm, Bishop of Sherborne and Abbot of Malmesbury (639–709), is said to have written an Old English translation of the Psalms, although this is disputed.

Cædmon (~657–684) is mentioned by Bede as one who sang poems in Old English based on the Bible stories, but he was not involved in translation per se.

Bede (c. 672–735) produced a translation of the Gospel of John into Old English, which he is said to have prepared shortly before his death.  This translation is lost; we know of its existence from Cuthbert of Jarrow's account of Bede's death.

The Vespasian Psalter (~850–875) is an interlinear gloss of the Book of Psalms in the Mercian dialect.  Eleven other Anglo-Saxon (and two later) psalters with Old English glosses are known. The earliest are probably the early-9th-century red glosses of the Blickling Psalter (Morgan Library & Museum, M.776). The latest Old English gloss is contained in the 12th-century Eadwine Psalter.  The Old English material in the Tiberius Psalter of around 1050 includes a continuous interlinear gloss of the psalms.

Alfred and the House of Wessex (875-999) 
As England was consolidated under the House of Wessex, led by descendants of Alfred the Great and Edward the Elder, translations continued. King Alfred (849–899) circulated a number of passages of the Bible in the vernacular. These included passages from the Ten Commandments and the Pentateuch, which he prefixed to a code of laws he promulgated around this time.  Alfred is also said to have directed the Book of Psalms to have been translated into Old English, though scholars are divided on Alfredian authorship of the Paris Psalter collection of the first fifty Psalms.

Between 950 and 970, Aldred the Scribe added a gloss in the Northumbrian dialect of Old English (the Northumbrian Gloss on the Gospels) to the Lindisfarne Gospels as well as a foreword describing who wrote and decorated it. Its version of The Lord's Prayer is as follows:
Suae ðonne iuih gie bidde fader urer ðu arð ðu bist in heofnum & in heofnas; sie gehalgad noma ðin; to-cymeð ric ðin. sie willo ðin suae is in heofne & in eorðo. hlaf userne oferwistlic sel us to dæg. & forgef us scylda usra suae uoe forgefon scyldgum usum. & ne inlæd usih in costunge ah gefrig usich from yfle

At around the same time (~950–970), a priest named Farman wrote a gloss on the Gospel of Matthew that is preserved in a manuscript called the Rushworth Gospels.

In approximately 990, a full and freestanding version of the four Gospels in idiomatic Old English appeared in the West Saxon dialect and are known as the Wessex Gospels. Seven manuscript copies of this translation have survived.
Fæder ure þu þe eart on heofonum, si þin nama gehalgod. To becume þin rice, gewurþe ðin willa, on eorðan swa swa on heofonum.  Urne gedæghwamlican hlaf syle us todæg, and forgyf us ure gyltas, swa swa we forgyfað urum gyltendum.  And ne gelæd þu us on costnunge, ac alys us of yfele. Soþlice.

At about the same time as the Wessex Gospels (~990), the priest Ælfric of Eynsham produced an independent translation of the Pentateuch with books of Joshua and Judges. His translations were used for the illustrated Old English Hexateuch.

Late Anglo-Saxon translations (after 1000) 
The Junius manuscript (initially ascribed to Cædmon) was copied about 1000. It includes Biblical material in vernacular verses: Genesis in two versions (Genesis A and Genesis B), Exodus, Daniel, and Christ and Satan, from the apocryphal Gospel of Nicodemus.

The three related manuscripts, Royal 1 A. xiv at the British Library, Bodley 441 and Hatton 38 at the Bodleian Library, are written in Old English, although produced in the late 12th century. Hatton 38 is noted as being written in the latest Kentish form of West Saxon. They cover the four Gospels, with one section (Luke 16.14–17.1) missing from both manuscripts, Hatton and Royal.

In 1066, the Norman Conquest marked the beginning of the end of the Old English language. Translating the Bible into Old English gradually ended with the movement from Old English to Middle English, and eventually there were attempts to provide Middle English Bible translations.

References

Sources

 .
 .
 .
 .
 .
 .
 .
 
 .
 .
 .
 
 .

External links
Ða Halgan Godspel on Englisc ("The Holy Gospels in English"), mostly based on Cod. Bibl. Pub. Cant. Ii. 2. 11.
Anglo-Saxon Versions of Scripture (some information)
Notes on Translations of the Anglo Saxon Bible from the University of Toronto
Translators and Translations of the Anglo Saxon Bible by Ian Williams, 2000.
List of English Bible Translations
 New digital editions, with manuscript images, of much of Old English biblical verse, including Junius 11 poems and metrical psalms and psalm excerpts, are available in the Old English Poetry in Facsimile Project, eds. Martin Foys, et al.(Madison, WI: Center for the History of Print and Digital Culture, 2019-), with translations from the Old English Poetry Project, Aaron Hostetter (trans.).

Old English literature
English, Old